Holland America Line is an American-owned cruise line, a subsidiary of Carnival Corporation & plc headquartered in Seattle, Washington, United States.

Holland America Line was founded in Rotterdam, Netherlands, and from 1873 to 1989, it operated as a Dutch shipping line, a passenger line, a cargo line and a cruise line operating primarily between the Netherlands and North America. As part of the company's legacy, it was directly involved in the transport of many hundreds of thousands of emigrants from the Netherlands to North America.

Holland America has been a subsidiary of Carnival Corporation since 1989.

History

Dutch shipping and passenger line (1873–1989) 
Holland America Line was founded in 1873, as the Nederlandsch-Amerikaansche Stoomvaart Maatschappij (Dutch-American Steamship Company), in short Holland-Amerika Lijn, a shipping and passenger line. It was headquartered in Rotterdam, in the building which is now the Hotel New York. It provided service from its European base to the Americas over the North Atlantic. The company was formed as a result of the reorganization of an earlier company, Plate, Reuchlin & Co. The company's first ship was the original , which sailed its 15-day maiden voyage from the Netherlands to New York City on October 15, 1872. Other services were started to other new world ports, including Hoboken, Baltimore and South America. Cargo service to New York started in 1909.

During the first 25 years, the company carried 400,000 people from Europe to the Americas. Other North American ports were added during the early 20th century.

Though transportation and shipping were the primary sources of revenue, in 1895, HAL offered its first vacation cruise. Its second vacation cruise, from New York to Palestine, was first offered in 1910.

One notable ship was the elegant 36,000-gross register ton  of 1937, it and  being the only two liners built in the 1930s to make a profit.

At the start of the Second World War, HAL had 25 ships; nine remained at war's end. At the beginning of the war, the Westernland acquired from the Red Star Line in 1939, berthed at Falmouth, England, became the seat of the Dutch government. The Nieuw Amsterdam sailed half a million miles transporting 400,000 military personnel. After the war, the shipping line was instrumental in transporting a massive wave of immigrants from the Netherlands to Canada and elsewhere.

By the late 1960s, the golden era of transatlantic passenger ships had been ended by the introduction of transatlantic jet air travel. HAL ended transatlantic service during the early 1970s, leaving the North Atlantic passenger trade for Cunard's Queen Elizabeth 2.

In 1973, it sold its cargo shipping division, which continued to operate freight liner services with freighters, a Lighter aboard ship ('LASH' ship, mv Bilderdijk) and then container ships under the trade name of Incotrans, with headquarters in Rotterdam, with some of its North American services operated in partnership with the French shipping line Compagnie Générale Maritime.

It ceased operating as a Dutch line in 1989, when it was purchased by Carnival for 1.2 billion guilders (€530 million). The proceeds were put into an investment company (HAL Investments), the majority of which is owned by the van der Vorm family.

Former fleet (before 1989)
List of HAL ships retired before the takeover by Carnival.

 , 1973–80 — Sank off of the coast of Alaska.
  (III), 1972–74, 1975–76, 1978–84 — Last in service for Commodore Cruise Line as Enchanted Isle
  (I), 1922–52 — 1940–45 Escaped to Britain in WW2, served as troop transport, returned to Rotterdam in 1945
  (II), 1972–76, 1978–84 — Sister to SS Veendam (III); Last known as Universe Explorer of World Explorer Lines
  (I), 1898–1911 — Sold to the Allan Line
 SS Statendam (II) — Taken over before completion as the White Star Line's 
  (III), 1929–40 — Scrapped after being set on fire to avoid capture at Rotterdam
  (IV), 1956–82 — Last in service for Regent Star as Regency. Inactive after Regent Star went bankrupt.
 (III) Torpedoed and sunk in convoy HX-133 on 27 Jun, 1941 by U-564 south of Iceland
 , 1951–73 — Sank 2003 on way to breakers
 SS Waterman, 1951–63 — Launched January 16, 1945 Decommissioned 1970.
 SS Zuiderkruis, 1951–63 — Launched May 5, 1944 Decommissioned 1969.
 , 1951–63 — Launched June 17, 1944 Decommissioned 1971.
 SS Westerdam, 1945–65 — Combination first class passenger/cargo vessel; scrapped Spain 1965
 , 1937 — In WW2 escaped to US neutral port, served as a British War Transport carrying over 350,000, returned to Holland in 1946. Breakers yard in 1974.
  — Scrapped 1940.
 , 1902 — Scrapped 1927, alerted  to ice early into its ill-fated maiden voyage.
 , 1900 — Scrapped 1947. It was the largest ship HAL owned at the time it was in service.
 , 1886 — scrapped 1895.
 , 1872 — Wrecked September 26, 1883.
 (II) — Sister ship of SS Volendam (I). In 1940, bombed in Rotterdam, repaired and requestioned by Hamburg-America Line. Used for German submarine crews stationed in Hamburg. Returned to service from Rotterdam 1947, scrapped Baltimore 1953.
 MV Sommelsdyk (III) 1939 — Pacific service, wartime service as U.S. troopship until Atlantic service in 1947, scrapped 1965.
 MV Sloterdyk (II) 1940 — Sister ship of MV Sommelsdyk (III). Atlantic service. Wartime service as U.S. troopship. Returned to the HAL in 1946, used as a troop transport to the Dutch East Indies during the Indonesian National Revolution and scrapped in 1966.

As a US-based cruise line (1989–present)

In 1989, the Holland America Line was purchased by Carnival Corp, thus becoming an American owned cruise line headquartered in Seattle, Washington, United States.

In the summer of 2011,  did two transatlantic crossings, the first traditional transatlantic runs made by the line in more than 40 years.

Beginning in September 2012, Rotterdam was based year-round out of Rotterdam, sailing to Europe, the Caribbean, as well as Asia, before returning to more varied itineraries and home ports by 2016.

 makes annual "Grand Voyages" lasting more than 60 days, including a grand circle of the Pacific Ocean each fall and a World Voyage sailing around the world, usually ranging from January to April/May.

All HAL ships have a dark blue hull with white superstructure, with the company's logo featured prominently on the functional smoke stacks.

Holland America also owns the following:
 the Westmark hotel chain operating in Alaska and the Yukon
 Half Moon Cay, a private Caribbean island (known officially as Little San Salvador Island) with most Caribbean cruises spending a day there.

On October 26, 2012, it was announced that a memorandum of agreement had been signed with Italian shipbuilder Fincantieri for the construction of a 2,660-passenger ship for Holland America Line scheduled for delivery in spring 2016. Also noted was that the addition of new ships would maintain passenger capacity if some of the older Carnival Corporation ships are sold.

The Holland America Group of HAL and Princess Cruises have a letter of understanding to buy the Yukon White Pass Railways from Skagway to the US-Canadian border. The purchase closed July 31, 2018.

The ships were sold in pairs, with the Maasdam and Veendam transferring to one company in August 2020, while the Amsterdam and Rotterdam moved to another company in fall 2020. One pair went to a new cruise brand and the other to an existing brand.

Most cruise lines suspended their sailings because of the COVID-19 pandemic in 2020. As of 6 January 2021, all Holland America sailings were cancelled to at least 30 April 2021, according to an industry news item. That report listed no specific sailings for Holland America prior to the first week of June 2021.

Fleet

Current fleet

Former fleet
Holland America's parent company, Carnival Corporation & plc, currently owns 2 ex-Holland America Line ships operated by Marella Cruises. Marella Spirit was operated by Louis Cruises under sub-charter to Marella until 2018, when she was sold for scrap. Her sister ship, the Marella Celebration, still remains in operation. The  was built as Homeric in 1986 before moving to Holland America as Westerdam in 1988.

When Carnival Corporation acquired Costa Cruises in 2000, she was then transferred to the Costa fleet as Costa Europa in 2002. She has since been under charter to Marella since 2010. It was announced on May 19, 2014 that both the Statendam and Ryndam would be transferred to P&O Cruises Australia fleet.

See also

 Carnival Corporation & plc

References

Notes

Bibliography

External links

 
 The Last Ocean Liners - Holland America Line - trade routes and ships of the Holland America Line during the 1950s and 60s.
 Nederlandsch-Amerikaansche Stoomvaart Maatschappij / Holland America Line The Ships List
 
 Holland-America Line History and Ephemera GG Archives

 
Carnival Corporation & plc
Companies based in Seattle
Cruise lines
Dutch companies established in 1873
History of Rotterdam
Shipping companies of the Netherlands
Shipping companies of the United States
Transatlantic shipping companies
Transport companies established in 1873
1989 mergers and acquisitions